Andriy Oleksandrovych Dykan (born 16 July 1977) is a retired Ukrainian football goalkeeper who last played for Russian side FC Krasnodar. His previous clubs include Terek Grozny and Spartak Moscow. Dykan was also a full Ukrainian international, winning 8 caps for his country.

He also holds Russian citizenship which he obtained in 2000 in Khabarovsk.

Club career 
Born in Kharkiv, Andriy Dykan played in Ukrainian lower league clubs, until he joined the Russian First Division side SKA-Energiya Khabarovsk in 1999. He became a first-choice goalkeeper and also regularly took penalties, scoring 9 goals in his 5 years with the club. Young and gifted goalkeeper was noticed by a number of top flight Russian clubs, but deal offers from Lokomotiv Moscow and Rubin Kazan were rejected due to various reasons.

In 2004, Dykan signed for FC Kuban Krasnodar, where he also became a regular starter, but following an illness, lost his first-team place to Vladimir Gabulov. Dykan then moved back to Ukraine and joined FC Tavriya Simferopol in January 2008.

In January 2009, he left Tavriya on a free transfer and moved to FC Terek Grozny. His outstanding performances in the first half of 2010 season earned him an offer from Russian giants FC Spartak Moscow. In August 2010, Dykan signed a contract with the Moscow club. In his only second competitive game for Spartak, an UEFA Champions League away match against Olympique de Marseille on 15 September 2010, Dykan became the hero of the hour, keeping the clean sheet and making many crucial saves, as Spartak went on to win the game 1–0. He maintained steady performances in 2010–11 UEFA Europa League, keeping two clean sheets against AFC Ajax in the round of sixteen and thus helping Spartak to defeat Dutch team 4-0 on aggregate. Dykan's form in Russian Premier League was also solid, meaning that Spartak's goalkeeper troubles that had emerged after the departure of Stipe Pletikosa, were finally over. As of spring 2012, Dykan remains an undoubted number one goalkeeper of Spartak, and his ability to make spectacular saves as well as virtual absence of blunders have earned him much respect from the fans.

After recovering from injury, Dykan was forced to settle for a place on the bench due to the outstanding performances of Sergei Pesyakov and Artyom Rebrov, previously Spartak's second and third-choice keepers, respectively. However, he then returned to being Spartak's first choice 'keeper, putting in an impressive performance against city rivals CSKA.

The next season, he didn't play regularly and at one point became the fourth-choice goalkeeper. Towards the end of the season, however, Dykan was reinstated to the team, as Spartak claimed a disappointing sixth-place finish in the Russian Premier League. Dykan ended his career after two seasons at Krasnodar.

International career 
Dykan made his debut for the Ukraine national football team in a friendly match against Norway on 2 June 2010, at the age of 32. He continued making regular appearances for the national team, and as Ukraine's home European Championship approached, Dykan, despite his belated debut, appeared to be the most probable choice for Ukraine's starting goalkeeper at the tournament. Alongside his promising performances for the national team, his position was also strengthened by the injury of veteran Oleksandr Shovkovskyi and the 2-year ban of young prospect Oleksandr Rybka. However, on 31 March 2012, while playing for Spartak against Zenit, he suffered a collision with Zenit's Aleksandr Kerzhakov and was injured. Dykan was diagnosed with multiple facial bones fractures, craniocerebral trauma and brain concussion. He went on to miss the final tournament, and failed to make an appearance for Ukraine again.

Honours
Individual:

 Russian First Division best goalkeeper: 2005.

with Spartak Moscow:

 Russian Premier League: Runner-up, 2012
 Copa del Sol: Winner, 2012 (exhibition tournament)

References

External links 
 
 
Profile on Terek official website 

1977 births
Living people
Footballers from Kharkiv
Ukrainian footballers
Ukrainian expatriate sportspeople in Russia
Association football goalkeepers
FC Spartak Moscow players
SC Tavriya Simferopol players
FC Kuban Krasnodar players
FC Akhmat Grozny players
FC Zirka Kropyvnytskyi players
Ukrainian Premier League players
Ukrainian First League players
Ukrainian Second League players
Russian Premier League players
Ukraine international footballers
FC SKA-Khabarovsk players
FC Krasnodar players